The Washington Army National Guard is a component of the United States Army and the Washington National Guard based in Washington. The history of the Washington Army National Guard dates back to 1854 with formation of the Washington Territorial Militia. The command is headquartered at Camp Murray in Pierce County. It consists of 6,200 soldiers in two brigades and various smaller units located throughout the state.

Units

Joint Forces Headquarters
96th Aviation Troop Command
1st Battalion, 168th Aviation Regiment (General Support Aviation Battalion [GSAB])
Headquarters and Headquarters Company, 1-168th GSAB
Company B, 1st Battalion, 168th GSAB
Detachment 2, Company C, 1st Battalion, 168th GSAB
Company D, 1st Battalion, 168th GSAB
Company E, 1st Battalion, 168th GSAB
Company C, 140th
Detachment 1, Company B, 351st
Company C, 1st Battalion, 112th Aviation
Detachment 7, 2nd Battalion, 245th Aviation Regiment
Detachment 51, Washington Army National Guard Operational Support Air Lift Command
81st Stryker Brigade Combat Team
Headquarters & Headquarters Company
Special Troops Battalion
1st Battalion, 161st Infantry Regiment
3rd Battalion, 161st Infantry Regiment
2nd Battalion, 146th Field Artillery Regiment
181st Support Battalion
898th Brigade Engineer Battalion
96th Troop Command
Headquarters & Headquarters Company
1st Squadron, 303rd Cavalry Regiment
144th Army Liaison Team (United States Army Forces Command)
122nd Theater Public Affairs Support Element
141st Military History Detachment
133rd Army National Guard Band
420th Chemical Battalion
Headquarters & Headquarters Company
506th Military Police Company
540th Chemical Detachment
176th Engineer Company
792nd Chemical Company
1041st Transportation Company 
741st Ordnance Battalion
Headquarters & Headquarters Company
319th Explosive Ordnance Disposal Company (EOD)
741st Explosive Ordnance Battalion
56th Theater Information Operations Group
156th Information Operations Battalion
341st Military Intelligence Battalion (Linguist)
Company A, 341st Military Intelligence Battalion
Company B, 341st Military Intelligence Battalion
Company A, 1st Battalion, 19th Special Forces Group (Airborne)
Special Operations Detachment - Pacific Command
205th Regiment (Regional Training Institute)
Headquarters Company
1st Battalion, 205th Regiment
2nd Battalion, 205th Regiment

The WA Guard also maintains the 10th Weapons of Mass Destruction Civil Support Team (WMD-CST).

History

The history of the National Guard of Washington begins in 1855 before it was granted statehood, when the Washington Territorial Legislature created an organized militia. Washington was granted statehood in 1890, after which the organized militia transformed into a state militia. This militia was known as the Washington State Militia, and fought its first major conflict during the Spanish American War. In 1903, the Washington National Guard (Alongside all other state militias) were given to joint federal-state control after the passage of the Militia Act of 1903.

Activations
1917 — World War I
1940 — World War II
1948 — Flood relief in Ellensburg
1950 — Korean War
1980 — Mount St. Helens eruption
1990/91 — Persian Gulf War
1990's — Bosnia-Herzegovina
1994 — Central Washington forest fires
1999 — Seattle WTO riots
2000 — Kosovo
2000 — North Macedonia
2002–2014 — Operation Enduring Freedom
2003–present — Operation Iraqi Freedom
2006 — Eastern Washington forest fires
2007 — Flood relief for five western counties
2014 — Oso landslide
2014 — 2014 Wildfires
2015 — 2015 Wildfires
2017 — 2017 Wildfires
2018 — 2018 Wildfires

Historic units
  161st Infantry Regiment
 1444th and 241st TC Detachment
  146th Field Artillery Regiment
  205th Air Defense Artillery Regiment
 303d Armor - The regiment traces its history from the 803d Tank Battalion, redesignated from 803d Tank Destroyer Battalion on 13 September 1946. Reorganized and federally recognized 18 March 1947 with HQ at Centralia. Reorganized and redesignated 15 April 1959 as the 303d Armor, with one battalion (1959-1963),  two battalions (1963-1968), and one battalion from that date. Consolidated with 803d Armor (constituted 1 January 1974) between 15 April and 1 September 1993.
 303d Cavalry Regiment - The Regiment was constituted on 1 January 1968 as the 303d Cavalry, a parent regiment under CARS, and on the same day ('concurrently') organized to consist of Troop E, a component of the 81st Infantry Brigade. Transferred from CARS to USARS 1 June 1989 with headquarters at Camp Murray. Reorganized, redesignated, and consolidated 1 May 1992, consisting (unchanged) as Troop E, a component of the 81st Infantry Brigade, at Puyallup.

See also
Troop B, Washington Cavalry
Washington Air National Guard
Washington State Guard
Washington Military Department

References

Further reading
McLatchy, Patrick H., The Development of the National Guard of Washington as an Instrument of Social Control, 1854-1916.  Unpub. Ph.D dissertation, University of Washington, 1973.
Carey, Daniel C., The Washington State National Guard, 1901-1917.  Unpub. MA thesis, Washington State University, 1993.
Washington State, Military Department, Office of the Adjutant General.  Washington National Guard Pamphlet:  The Official History of the Washington National Guard.  7 vols.  Compiled by Virgil F. Field.  Camp Murray, WA, 1959.
Washington State, Military Department, Office of the Adjutant General.  A Brief History of the Washington Territorial Militia, 1855–1889 and the National Guard of the State of Washington, 1889-1957.  Compiled by Virgil F. Field.  Mimeographed, 1957.

External links

 Wash. Military Dept. - Army National Guard
 Bibliography of Washington Army National Guard History compiled by the United States Army Center of Military History

Army National Guard